Sheldon Ocker (born August 1942) is an American sportswriter.

Ocker attended Buchtel High School in Akron, Ohio, graduating in 1960. He attended Ohio State University, and graduated with a degree in political science in 1964. He worked for one year at the Sandusky Register, and was hired by the Akron Beacon Journal in 1967. For the Beacon Journal, he covered high school sports for three years, the Cleveland Cavaliers for ten years, and covered the Cleveland Indians from 1981 through 2013. He was the President of the Baseball Writers' Association of America in 1985. Ocker was named the 2018 winner of the J. G. Taylor Spink Award., inducting him into National Baseball Hall of Fame.

References

Living people
21st-century American non-fiction writers
American male non-fiction writers
Baseball writers
BBWAA Career Excellence Award recipients
American sportswriters
Sportswriters from Ohio
Ohio State University College of Arts and Sciences alumni
Writers from Akron, Ohio
1942 births
21st-century American male writers